Address Book Server dates back several years before the inclusion of the feature to share contacts in 10.6 Server. This product is based on Sync Services and synchronised contacts between network Macintosh computers, thus allowing the contacts to be present in the local Address Book in the same manner as any other contacts. The server has a friendly web interface which can be used to provide access to Windows / Linux or remote users.

This product is not to be confused with the Address Book Server included in Snow Leopard Server (10.6). Unlike Apple's offering this Address Book Server offers more features, such as a web interface and supports 10.4, 10.5, 10.6 and 10.7.

Address Book Server consists of two separate components. One server side package which requires installation on a dedicated server and a client components which installs a panel in System Preferences. Once installed the server will publish its presence on the local network using Bonjour and can be accessed via Safari bookmarks. The client requires some basic configuration. Once enabled you contacts and calendar events can be synchronised (published) to your server. Once published the records can be accessed via the server web interface. At this stage any other clients can also enabled to synchronise their own local records with the server.

The basic setup of Address Book Server consist of clients periodically synchronising with the server. During synchronisation any changes (or the entire data set) is fetched form the server, then via Sync Services compared with the local records present on the server. Any differences between the local records and those received form the server are sent back to the server to update the central database.

More details about Address Book Server are available on the website.

The project was abandoned in 2010 and is no longer undergoing development.

Internet protocols